Slotback, sometimes referred to as an A-back or slot receiver, is a position in gridiron football. The "slot" is the area between the offensive tackle and the wide receiver. A player who lines up between those two players and behind the line of scrimmage fills that "slot".

The slotback position is a fixture of Canadian football and indoor football where they act as extra receivers. It is also used in American football where the position requires a versatile player who must combine the receiving skills of a wide receiver, the ball-carrying skills of a running back, and the blocking skills of a tight end.

Slotbacks are often as many as five yards behind the line of scrimmage when the ball is snapped. In both the Canadian and indoor game, slotbacks can make a running start toward the line of scrimmage before the snap. In most forms of American football this would be called illegal motion, although a few professional leagues such as the World Football League and XFL allowed forward motion.

Role
Slotbacks are primarily used as hybrid running backs/receivers, but are often used to provide pass protection on blitzes and blocking as required on running plays. They are preferred over the wide receiver or tight end for receiving short passes or hand-offs due to their positioning being closer to the quarterback. When formations containing slotbacks are used in American football, the team often has to go without a tight end, a fullback, or a running back due to there being only 11 men on the offense and 7 being on the line of scrimmage. This is one reason that slotbacks are rarer in the American game. 

However, as NFL teams have increasingly "defaulted to three- and four-receiver sets" in recent years, the slot receiver has become a fixture of American football formations. In terms of a depth chart, a slotback is typically considered the third wide receiver and may be expected to be a "possession receiver" that can reliably catch a pass when covered by a safety, since they are most commonly used when converting medium-distance third-down conversions.

Slotbacks are used effectively in flexbone formations where they are used as extra receivers.
Slotbacks are usually smaller and faster players and are used for short passes and short runs to get extra yards or a first down or third down drive.

It is important to note that players are not drafted to become slotbacks in the NFL. This position is filled as needed by a wide receiver or running back with the necessary skill-set to effectively play the position. Slotbacks must be able to block, catch, and evade tacklers while still being highly productive. In 2019, the Navy Midshipmen football team had a highly productive season when their slotbacks gained over 1,500 all-purpose yards.

In Canadian football, slotbacks are basically the same as wide receivers, except that they line up closer to the quarterback and can use the waggle (motion before the snap). They rarely block or run the ball and are almost always sent out to receive passes.

Examples 

As the NFL shifted to a pass-heavy league over the past few years there has been an explosion of slotbacks. Some prime examples are the recently retired Darren Sproles and Larry Fitzgerald, along with active player Christian McCaffrey.

Fitzgerald extended his football career by moving from an outside receiving position into the slot where he is able to use his quick change of direction in tandem with his willingness to block to still be considered among the best in the league at what he does.

McCaffrey entered the NFL in 2017 and has never failed to put up over 1,000 yards from scrimmage (as of 2020). In fact, in 2019 he totaled a thousand yards running and a thousand yards receiving, with a lot of those receiving yards coming from the slotback position McCaffrey is an unusual example, because most slotbacks are not expected to get the most touches in an offense, but he was the Carolina Panthers' leading rusher over the last two seasons while putting up great stats as a receiver as well.

Darren Sproles was never a prolific running back, but he was a great slotback. His 2011 season is the epitome of what a slotback should be. He ran the ball 87 times and he added 86 receptions for over 1,300 yards from scrimmage and 9 touchdowns

Slotbacks are very important in the CFL, where most formations include 3 slotbacks and 2 wide receivers in a 5-receiver set. In the TSN Top 50 CFL Players, four of the top players in league history were slotbacks: Allen Pitts, Milt Stegall, Ray Elgaard, and Terry Vaughn. These players were typically the most reliable receivers on their team.

In American football, slotbacks are labeled as wide receivers on depth charts.

See also
H-back, a similar position

References 

American football positions
Canadian football terminology